Net Creek is a stream in Northeastern Ontario, Canada. It is located in Best, Strathy and Cassels townships of the municipality of Temagami. The creek flows through at least four lakes, namely Petraut Lake, Duncan Lake, Ferguson Lake and Net Lake.

Course and hydrology
Net Creek begins from the south end of Rib Lake in Best Township. At the south end of Ferguson Lake the creek then flows south-southwest  into Net Lake. From the south end of Outlet Bay, Net Creek flows south-southeast into Cassels Lake.

Net Creek is part of the Ottawa River drainage basin, a large area covering much of eastern Ontario and western Quebec where water drains into the Ottawa River. After Net Creek flows into Cassels Lake, the water enters Rabbit Lake, which is drained by the Matabitchuan River. The Matabitchuan River then flows into Lake Timiskaming where the water eventually enters the Ottawa River.

The dam was originally built around the 1920s by the Temagami Timber Company but was rebuilt in 1974 with the purpose of controlling water levels in Net Lake.

See also
List of rivers of Ontario

References

External links

Rivers of Temagami
Strathy Township